Sofiane Oumiha (born 23 December 1994) is a French lightweight boxer. He won silver medals at the 2015 European Games and at the 2016 Summer Olympics.

Professional career
Oumiha was scheduled to make his professional debut on 6 March 2021, at Queensberry Poland in Lublin. The fight was canceled with his team hoping for a new date later this year in England.

Professional boxing record

References

External links
 

1994 births
Living people
French male boxers
Lightweight boxers
Olympic boxers of France
Boxers at the 2016 Summer Olympics
Olympic silver medalists for France
Olympic medalists in boxing
Medalists at the 2016 Summer Olympics
Mediterranean Games gold medalists for France
Competitors at the 2013 Mediterranean Games
Competitors at the 2018 Mediterranean Games
Sportspeople from Toulouse
AIBA World Boxing Championships medalists
World boxing champions
Mediterranean Games medalists in boxing
Boxers at the 2015 European Games
Boxers at the 2019 European Games
European Games medalists in boxing
European Games silver medalists for France
Boxers at the 2020 Summer Olympics
21st-century French people